Kumphawapi is a district (amphoe) in the southern part of Udon Thani province, northeastern Thailand.

Etymology 
Kumpha  is from Sanskrit 'pitcher' or 'water-pot', as reflected in the name of February, associated with the zodiac sign of Aquarius. Wapi  is from Sanskrit 'pond', synonymous with หนองนํ้า, บึง.

Geography
Neighboring districts are (from the southwest clockwise): Non Sa-at,  Nong Saeng, Mueang Udon Thani, Prachaksinlapakhom, Ku Kaeo and Si That of Udon Thani Province; Tha Khantho of Kalasin province and Kranuan of Khon Kaen province.

North of the central town is the shallow Nong Han Kumphawapi Lake. The lake is surrounded by marshland, one of the largest natural wetlands in northeast Thailand. The lake is drained by Lam Pao.

History
Mueang Kumphawapi was one of the four original subdivisions of Udon Thani, which were converted into amphoes during the thesaphiban administrative reforms in 1908.

Symbols
The district slogan is "Kumphawapi, city of sugar, monkey park, highland of glass Buddha station, goose wetland stream of life."

Administration

Central administration 
Kumphawapi is divided into 13 sub-districts (tambons), which are further subdivided into 176 administrative villages (mubans).

Missing numbers are tambon which now form Prachak Sinlapakhom District.

Local administration 
There are nine sub-district municipalities (thesaban tambons) in the district:
 Kumphawapi consisting of parts of sub-district Kumphawapi.
 Phan Don consisting of parts of sub-district Phan Don.
 Huai Koeng consisting of sub-district Huai Koeng.
 Pa Kho consisting of sub-district Pakho.
 Wiang Kham consisting of sub-district Wiang Kham.
 Nong Wa consisting of sub-district Nong Wa.
 Kong Phan Phan Don consisting of parts of sub-district Phan Don.
 Chaelae consisting of sub-district Chaelae.
 Chiang Wae consisting of sub-district Chiang Wae.

There are six subdistrict administrative organizations (SAO) in the district:
 Tum Tai consisting of sub-district Tum Tai.
 Soephloe consisting of sub-district Soephloe.
 Si O consisting of sub-district Si O.
 Pha Suk consisting of sub-district Pha Suk.
 Tha Li consisting of sub-district Tha Li.
 Kumphawapi consisting of parts of sub-district Kumphawapi.

References

External links
amphoe.com

Kumphawapi